Long Beach City College (LBCC) is a public community college in Long Beach, California. It was established in 1927 and is divided into two campuses, the Liberal Arts Campus in Lakewood Village and the Pacific Coast Campus in central Long Beach on Pacific Coast Highway. It is the only college in the Long Beach Community College District.

LBCC serves San Pedro, Catalina Island and the cities of Long Beach, Lakewood and Signal Hill. During the 2015–2016 academic year, the college had an enrollment of 33,818 students.

History
Founded in 1927, Long Beach City College was initially housed at Wilson Classical High School in southeast Long Beach. The 1933 Long Beach earthquake resulted in classes being held at Recreation Park until 1935, when the college moved into its Liberal Arts Campus in Lakewood Village at Carson Street and Clark Avenue.

During and after World War II, the college increased so rapidly that a new campus had to be established. This was realized in 1949 with the establishment of the Pacific Coast Campus, occupied on the former site of Hamilton Junior High School. As Long Beach City College grew in the 1970s, state law separated the college from the Long Beach Unified School District. In that decade and the 1980s, Proposition 13 signaled retrenchment for the college, with many popular classes and services folding.

Also during the 1980s, the arrival of refugees from Southeast Asia resulted in the need for extensive courses in the ESL program. This program became the largest at the college due to a later wave of amnesty applicants.

1987 saw the college acquire neighboring Veterans Memorial Stadium from the City of Long Beach. Even before it acquired the stadium, as far back as the early 1970s, the college was allowed to use its facilities as a practice field and to provide several hundred much-needed parking for students of the college. In recent years, the college has upgraded the stadium playing surface, its swimming pool facility, as well as established wireless internet and e-mail services in 2005.

Bond Measure E has seen the construction of a Child Development Center at the PCC, and construction for new buildings on both campuses are underway, including a new South Quad Complex Building on the formers LAC golf mall, a new Industrial Technology Building at the PCC, and a new East Campus for the Culinary Arts Program.

Name
Long Beach Junior College opened its doors at Woodrow Wilson High School in 1927 to 503 students, and in 1935, the college moved to the campus on the corner of Carson and Clark. Reorganization brought together all post-high school education in 1944, resulting in the name becoming Long Beach City College, and splitting into the Liberal Arts Division, the General Adult Division, and Technical Institute Division. The Liberal Arts Division remained on the original Junior College campus, and became known as the Liberal Arts Campus. The General Adult Division and Technical Institute Division offered courses at surrounding educations centers, until a second LBCC campus was opened on the former site of Hamilton Junior High School in 1949 as a result of increased enrollment after World War II. This campus was originally called the Business and Technology Division Campus and eventually became known as the Pacific Coast Campus while the Liberal Arts Campus remained the same.

At this time a survey is being conducted to inquire with the Faculty, Staff and Students if they feel that the two campus names should be changed to reflect the current curriculum of each campus.

Campuses

The campuses are located in Long Beach, Los Angeles County, California. The Liberal Arts Campus is situated north of Interstate 405 and south of State Highway 91, along the major roads of Carson Street, which divides the campus in two portions, Lakewood Boulevard, which borders the campus to the west, and Clark Avenue, which borders the campus to the east.

The Pacific Coast Campus is situated north of Pacific Coast Highway, bordered by Orange Avenue to the west, Walnut Avenue to the east, and Mary Butler School to the north. Year round, there is a mild climate moderated by ocean breezes from the Pacific.

Most students, faculty and staff commute to campus. Long Beach Transit serves both campuses, with routes 93, 101, 103, and 112 serving LAC, and routes 71, 171, 172, 173, 174, and 175 serving PCC. Due to the increasing student enrollment, there have been issues regarding parking, and as a consequence, those with parking permits usually arrive early during the first few weeks of each semester to avoid traffic. Recent construction projects from Bond Measure E have aggravated the parking situation, but this will be temporary upon completion.

Student support services and programs

Long Beach City College offers a variety of Student Support Services and Programs.

These programs are:

Career & Job Services (LAC/PCC) - Career counselors assist with the exploration and development of career and employment goals.
CalWORKs (PCC) - Supportive services to county public assistance (welfare) recipients in the form of dedicated CalWORKs counselors, case management, childcare, work-study.
Child Development Center (LAC/PCC) - Quality child care is given to 2- to 5-year-old children of Long Beach City College students, faculty and staff.
Disabled Students Programs and Services (LAC/PCC) - DSPS provides many support services that enable students with disabilities to participate in the college's programs and activities including note-takers, readers, interpreters and assistance with registration.
English as a Second Language Office (PCC) - Provides bilingual information on college services and benefits by ESL Counselors and Advisors, offers the ESL test, and provides assistance with online registration.
Extended Opportunity Programs & Services (LAC/PCC) - Retention program designed to assist qualified students with educational counseling, priority registration, assistance with transfer and assistance with textbooks/supplies.
Cooperative Agencies Resources for Education (LAC/PCC) - Additional assistance for EOPS students who are single parents, head of household, have at least one child 13 years of age or younger and are participating in CalWORKs or GAIN.

Honors Program (LAC/PCC) - Provides classes and programs to prepare high-achieving students for transfer to competitive four-year colleges and universities.
International Students Program (LAC) - Services in immigration matters; academic, career and personal counseling; and housing assistance to international students.
American Language and Culture Institute (LAC) - Provides English language preparation and an F-1 visa for international students.
Transfer Center (LAC/PCC) - Helps new and transfer-bound students with registration and transfer workshops, LBCC online access, and assists in communication with university representatives.
TRIO Go Project (PCC) - Academic, career, financial, and personal advising services for students who are either first-generation college students, low income and/or learning/physically disabled. It offers academic and transfer counseling services, tutoring, cultural enrichment, and field trips. Growth and Opportunities (GO) Project 
Puente (LAC) - Prepares educationally underserved students to transfer to four-year colleges and universities. It is an academic, counseling and mentoring program helping students build the skills necessary for academic success and career goals.

Student Success Centers (LAC/PCC)- Academic support and learning assistance for students across the disciplines.

Academics

Long Beach City College offers a wide range of programs, including business, health, trade and industry, communications, and liberal arts, as well as a wide variety vocational programs spanning various occupational trades. The college is recognized nationally for its nursing program, and has an honors program for its high-achieving students. The English as a Second Language (ESL) program is one of the largest on campus.

The college is divided into six schools.

School of Business and Social Science
The School of Business and Social Science provides academic and vocational programs in the fields of Business Administration, Computer and Business Information Systems, Computer and Office Technologies, Distributive Education, History and Political Science and Public Service and Social Sciences.  It is the largest school at the college.

School of Creative Arts and Applied Sciences
The School of Creative Arts and Applied Sciences provides academic and vocational programs in the fields of Art and Photography, Child Development, Family and Consumer Studies, which include Fashion, Food and Nutrition, and Interior Design, Music, Radio and Television, Speech Communication, Theatre, Dance and Film.

Commercial Music Program 
The Commercial Music Program at Long Beach City College provided:

A "Certificate of Achievement [that] will prepare students for an entry-level position as an audio engineer in fields such as: recording studio, live sound, mastering, music video, foley, television, film, theater, and multi-media." as well as an "Associate Degree [that] will prepare students for career advancement once a certificate has been earned. Appropriate course selection will also facilitate transfer to a four-year college or university music performance program."

Notable Faculty from the Commercial Music Program 
Many of the professors were and still are successful professionals in the music industry (see below).
 Dr. George Shaw 
 Dr. Maurice Love 
 Charles Gutierrez (currently teaching at University of Southern California) 
 Christopher Cain (also a taught at University of Southern California and California State University, Long Beach) 
 Louie Teran

Notable Alumni from the Commercial Music Program 
There are many former students and alumni that attended the Commercial Music Program who became successful professionals in the music industry (see below).
 Rickey Minor from the Jay Leno Show
 Wayne Bergeron, a highly acclaimed trumpet player
 Stanley Smith of the Bernie Mac Show
 Rex Silas who worked closely with Janet Jackson
 Cornelius Mims bass player with Michael Jackson, Smokey Robinson, Kenny Loggins, Gladys Knight, Boyz II Men 
 Nikki Harris, composer and vocalist for Madonna, Marilyn Manson, Santana, Jessica Simpson 
 Dorian Holley, vocals for Michael Jackson, Rod Stewart, Josh Groban 
 Joanna Glass, a recording engineer and touring violinist for Betty Steeles
 "Skee-Lo" Antoine Roundtree
 A.J. Luke
 Warren G
Due to budget restraints, the Commercial Music Program at Long Beach City College was one of 11 programs that were discontinued in 2013. In 2022, LBCC re-opened the Commercial Music Program.

School of Health, Science and Mathematics
The School of Health and Science is home to the nursing program, making the school the 2nd largest at the college. In addition to programs in Registered and Vocational Nursing, the school provides academic and vocation programs in Diagnostic Medical Imaging and Emergency Medical Technician, Life Sciences such as Anatomy, Biology, Health Education, and Physiology, Physical Sciences such as Chemistry, Physics, Environmental Science, and Mathematics, Engineering, .

School of Language Arts
The School of Language Arts provides academic and vocational programs in the fields of English, English as a Second Language, and Foreign Languages.

School of Physical Education and Athletics
The School of Physical Education and Athletics offers classes to assist in health and well-being, and hosts intercollegiate athletic events.

School of Trade and Industrial Technologies
The School of Trade and Industrial Technologies provides academic and vocational programs in the fields of Air Conditioning and Refrigeration, Auto/Diesel Mechanics, Aviation Maintenance and Pilot Training, Construction, Horticulture, Drafting, Electronics and Electricity, Machine Tool, Sheet Metal, and Welding. Most of the school's programs are located at the Pacific Coast Campus.

Student life

Long Beach City College is populated with many student-run clubs and organizations. The Associated Student Body (ASB), is the largest group on campus, and is the organization that funds most of the events geared toward students at the college. The ASB Student Senate overlooks the independent clubs as well as the men's and women's social service clubs that used to be under the now-defunct Associated Men's Students (AMS) and Associated Women's Students (AWS).
LBCC is also known for having a nationally renowned volunteer service program, as well as the oldest community college intramural athletics program in the nation.

There are campus-run radio and television stations, as well as a campus-run newspaper, named the Viking.

Traditional events include Homecoming Week, the Spring Sing variety show, and Mini Grand Prix, a three-man push-cart race tournament.

Each of the campuses has its own Alpha Gamma Sigma chapter.

The campuses were well known for their high populations of resident domestic rabbits, though since 2011 the population has diminished substantially.
The rabbits were humanely trapped and spayed or neutered. Over 200 rabbits were happily adopted, while around three dozen of the now-fixed animals were too wild to become pets and have been allowed to continue roaming the campus.

Athletics

Long Beach City College has 21 athletic programs for men and women. The teams are known as the Vikings, and they have won 16 national and 84 state championships as of Spring 2006. The mascot is a viking named Ole.
The Vikings are recognized as a powerhouse in some of the most competitive community college conferences in California, as well as the nation.

The Long Beach City College Viking's 1950 football team celebrated what would be their first of five National Championships:(1950,1960,1962,1964,1995)

The 2005-06 season saw Long Beach City College win for the first-ever time the Pepsi/NATYCAA Cup, State Associations Division, from the National Association of Two-Year College Athletic Administrators (NATYCAA). This award represents the best junior college athletics program in the state of California. LBCC won the award by 20.5 points over second-place Mount San Antonio College, buoyed by state titles in men's water polo, women's soccer, baseball, and men's volleyball, for a total of 174.5 points. 

Hall of Champions, the indoor athletics venue, was the home of the now-defunct Long Beach Breakers of the American Basketball Association's current incarnation.

Men's intercollegiate teams

Men's intercollegiate teams are: baseball, basketball, cross country, football, golf, soccer, swimming & diving, track and field, volleyball, and water polo.

Women's intercollegiate teams
Women's intercollegiate teams are: basketball, cross country, golf, soccer, softball, swimming & diving, tennis, track and field, volleyball, and water polo.

Noted staff and alumni

Ahmad, rapper, songwriter, motivational speaker, and author 
Millicent Borges Accardi, poet, writer, National Endowment for the Arts, Fulbright, Calif. Arts Council
Dominique Arnold, a track and field athlete.
LaVar Ball, football player, entrepreneur
Earl W. Bascom, inventor, actor, rodeo cowboy, Hall of Fame inductee, international artist and sculptor.
Kenny Booker, basketball player
Mack Calvin, a basketball player who played in the defunct American Basketball Association.
Schea Cotton, basketball player
Damion Easley, baseball player.
John Fante, writer and screenwriter.
Bruce Fraser, basketball coach
Charles Jordan, football player
Richard Keyes, Professor Emeritus at Long Beach City College, after a 30-year career there teaching life drawing and painting.
Tommy 'Tiny' Lister, actor and former professional wrestler. 
Pat McCormick, a two-time Olympic platform and springboard diver.
 Charles McShane, football player
Monte Nitzkowski, swimmer and water polo player; Olympics swimmer and water polo coach
Lute Olson NCAA Champion Basketball Coach 
Jenni Rivera, Mexican-American singer-songwriter, entrepreneur
Markus Steele, football player.
Carl Weathers, actor, linebacker for the Vikings in 1966.

References

External links

 
Education in Long Beach, California
California Community Colleges
Educational institutions established in 1927
Schools accredited by the Western Association of Schools and Colleges
Universities and colleges in Los Angeles County, California
1927 establishments in California
Two-year colleges in the United States